The SZD-15 Sroka (Szybowcowy Zakład Doświadczalny - Glider Experimental Works) was a single-seat glider designed and built in Poland in 1956.

Development 
The SZD-15 Sroka (Magpie) was designed as a replacement for the IS-B Komar in the single-seat trainer role, at the request of the LPŻ (Soldier's Friends League) from 1955. Of typical wooden construction with plywood or fabric covering, the SZD-15 Sroka was typical of many contemporary club training gliders throughout Europe. The main designer on the project was Z. Badura.

The first prototype, named 'Pionier' (registration SP-1598) was flown on 25 February 1956 by Stanisław Skrzydlewski at Bielsko, leading to modifications to improve the room in the cockpit, re-position the winch launch hook to increase directional stability during winch launching, and to increase the strength of the forward fuselage. Further improvements were made to the second prototype, SZD-15-2 Sroka (registration SP-1667), which flew on 1 February 1957. Production aircraft were designated SZD-15A, and 20 were built in ZSLS in Krosno, in addition to the two prototypes.

The flying characteristics of the SZD-15A were a marked improvement on those of the IS-B Komar, including better climb performance in weak thermals. The solo training regime employed by Polish Aero Clubs up to the late 1950s was eventually proven to be inefficient, thus the 'raison d'etre' of the SZD-15 Sroka was removed, and the remaining SZD-15s were used as club single seaters until superseded by higher performance club aircraft in the mid-1970s. Two, including the first prototype, are preserved in the Polish Aviation Museum in Kraków.

Variants 
SZD-15 Pioneer - the first prototype, registration SP-1598.
SZD-15-2 Sroka - the second prototype with modifications.
SZD-15A Sroka - production aircraft, 20 built.

Specifications (SZD-15 Sroka)

See also

References

Taylor, J. H. (ed) (1989) Jane's Encyclopedia of Aviation. Studio Editions: London. p. 29

External links

http://www.piotrp.de/SZYBOWCE/pszd15.htm

SZD-15
SZD-15
Aircraft first flown in 1956